All Together Now, released in July 1972, was the third album recorded by British rock band Argent. It was originally released on Epic Records, KE 31556. It was Argent's first hit album; it features "Hold Your Head Up", their most successful single, which reached #5 in the UK, Canadian, and U.S. singles charts. Other featured songs include "Tragedy" which reached #34 in the UK, "I Am the Dance of Ages" and "He's a Dynamo". The album reached #14 in Canada.

The 1997 compact disc re-release of All Together Now by Koch Records features an additional seven tracks not included on the original seven-track vinyl record. The bonus tracks include "God Gave Rock and Roll to You", which, owing to the popular cover/remake by Kiss, is one of Argent's best-known songs.

In 2009, for their reunion, Mr. Big recorded a cover of "Hold Your Head Up" and played it throughout the tour. Australian rock supergroup The Party Boys covered "Hold Your Head Up" in 1987 on their only studio album, The Party Boys. Uriah Heep also covered the song on their 1989 album Raging Silence. All bonus tracks were previously released on albums, except "Kingdom", which was the flip side of the "Celebration" single, and "Closer to Heaven" which was the B-side of the single "Hold Your Head Up".

In 2012, Esoteric Recordings of Europe released the album (ECLEC 2321) with "Closer to Heaven" as a bonus track.

In the Q and Mojo Classic Special Edition Pink Floyd & The Story of Prog Rock, the album ranked 33rd in the list of "40 Cosmic Rock Albums".

Steppenwolf covered "Hold Your Head Up" on their 1982 album Wolftracks.

Track listing 
Songs written by Rod Argent and Chris White except as noted.

The UK release had a red sticker on the cover, reading “Includes the hit single "Hold Your Head Up" and "Tragedy"”. It was a gatefold album with a four-page booklet, each page featuring a band member, with many photos.

"Celebration" and "Rejoice" are from the 1971 album Ring of Hands. "God Gave Rock and Roll to You", "It's Only Money (Part 2)" and "Christmas for the Free" are from the 1973 album In Deep. "Kingdom" is the B-side of the 1971 single "Celebration"; "Closer to Heaven" is the B-side of the 1972 single "Hold Your Head Up".

Personnel 
Argent
 Rod Argent – organ, electric piano, vocals
 Russ Ballard – guitar, piano (on track 3), vocals
 Jim Rodford – bass guitar, guitar, vocals
 Robert Henrit – drums, percussion

Releases
 CD All Together Now Sony Music Distribution 1994
 CD All Together Now Koch / eOne / Koch International 1997
 CD All Together Now Acadia 2006
 CD All Together Now [Bonus Tracks] Acadia 2007 
 CD All Together Now Sony Music Distribution 2008
 CD All Together Now [Bonus Track] Esoteric Records 2012

References 

1972 albums
Argent (band) albums
Epic Records albums
Albums produced by Rod Argent
Albums produced by Chris White (musician)